Madagascarctia feminina is a moth of the Arctiinae family.

Distribution
This moth is only known from Madagascar.

References

Arctiinae